The Nahle is a river of Saxony, Germany. It is a  tributary of the White Elster in Leipzig, Saxony. It is part of the Elster-Luppe system in the northern Leipzig floodplain forest.

See also
List of rivers of Saxony

Rivers of Saxony
Rivers of Germany